Stony Creek Mills is a census-designated place in Lower Alsace and Exeter Townships in Berks County, Pennsylvania.  It is located approximately five miles east of the city of Reading.  As of the 2010 census, the population was 1,045 residents.

Notable person

  Carl Furillo, professional baseball outfielder for the Brooklyn/Los Angeles Dodgers

References

External links

Census-designated places in Berks County, Pennsylvania
Census-designated places in Pennsylvania